The Cork-Limerick rivalry is a hurling rivalry between Irish county teams Cork and Limerick, who first played each other in 1893. Since the turn of the century it has come to be regarded as one of the biggest rivalries in Gaelic games. Cork's home ground is Páirc Uí Chaoimh and Limerick's home ground is the Gaelic Grounds, with each fixture alternating between the two venues.

While Cork are the standard bearers in Munster, Limerick have enjoyed success at sporadic intervals -they have won just four All-Ireland titles since 1940 although 3 of these came recently, in 2018,2020 and 2021.. At All-Ireland level Cork are second on the all-time roll of honour with thirty titles, while Limerick rank in fourth position with ten All-Ireland titles. On 29 July 2018, the sides met at Croke Park for the first time in the championship in the all Ireland semi-final. The counties  met on 22 August 2021 in the all Ireland final, also a first. Limerick were victorious, scoring 3-32 - an all time record.

Statistics

Recent results

Championship

Records

Scorelines

 Biggest win:
 For Cork: Cork 7-12 - 1-4 Limerick, Munster quarter-final, Fraher Field, 10 February 1907
 For Limerick: Limerick 3-18 - 1-8 Cork, Munster quarter-final, Páirc Uí Chaoimh, 26 May 1996
 Highest aggregate:
 Limerick 3-32 - 2-31 Cork, All-Ireland Semi Final, Croke Park, 29 July 2018
 Cork 6-7 - 4-13 Limerick, Munster final, Thurles Sportsfield, 16 July 1944

Top scorers

External links
 Cork v Limerick all-time results

References

Limerick
Limerick county hurling team rivalries